Scott Smith (born 1967) is a futurist, strategist, and writer known for coining the phrase "flatpack futures." Flatpack futures refers to "future technological systems which are imagined as readymade products that people will choose to adopt, rather than as the assembled work of countless different actors." Smith argues that this conception of the way the future will play out is limiting and counterproductive. 

Smith is the founder and managing partner of Changeist, a futures research and consulting company established in 2007 which has worked with UNICEF, Comcast, Nokia, and NASA to assist them in preparing for a complex future. He was also co-developer and advisor for the Futures Institute at the Duke University TIP program, and designed the Innovation & Future Thinking summer professional program at IED Barcelona. He is a frequent keynote speaker at Media Future Week, NEXT, and Lift conferences.

Smith began his technology forecasting career in 1995 as the Director of Digital Commerce at Mecklermedia (as Jupiter Communications), one of the earliest Internet research companies, helping companies prepare for the online world. He moved on to Director of Internet Business Strategies for Current Analysis in Sterling, Virginia in 1997. From 1999 through 2002 he was Director Networked Business Strategies Europe at the Yankee Group, and then worked as Director of Research Applications at Social Technologies (later Innovaro) until founding Changeist  with Susan Cox-Smith in 2007.

Smith was a columnist for Qz from 2012-2016, and wrote the Discontinuities column for Thesigers' Current Intelligence from 2011-2013.

Writing
 Embed: Mapping the Future of Work and Play: A case for “Embedding” Non-Ethnographers in the Field (with Andrew Greenman) Ethnographic Praxis in Industry Conference Proceedings 2006(1) · September 2006.
 Ludic Foresight (with Suzanne Stein). 2011.
 The Singularity is Boring: An Open, Collaborative ‘Mock-up’ Journal of Futures Studies, September 2012, 17(1): 151-158.
 Coda: Communicating Futures – An Uncommon Urge Journal of Futures Studies, September 2012, 17(1): 159-160.
 How to Future (with Madeline Ashby), 2020.

References

External links
 Changeist website

1967 births
American_designers
American futurologists
Living people